Ciruelos (Spanish for plum trees) is a Chilean village located southeast of Pichilemu, Cardenal Caro Province. In 1899, it had very few inhabitants, a free school, and a post office.

List of parish priests
Tomás Gutiérrez Romo (1779-1782)
Antonio Cornelio de Quesada y Molina (1782-1783)
Interinos (1783-1788)
Tomás Ostolaza y Donoso (1788-1829)
José Alejo Zavala y Vargas (1829-1849)
José del Tránsito Bustamante Martínez Coadjutor (1847-1850)
Rafael Jofré Guajardo (1850-1854)
Fernando Barrales (1854-1859)
Vicente Núñez Valdivia y José María Aguirre interinos (1867)
Pedro Aguilera, traslada la sede a Cahuil (1859-1867)
José Miguel Vásquez (1867)
José Agustín Contreras Jiménez (1867-1869)
Ramón Sotomayor Valdebenito interino (1869)
José María Montes Solar (1869-1870)
Fray Antonio Buenaventura Ramírez (1870-1871)
Félix Olea Pavez (1871-1874)
Francisco Bustamante (1874-1877)
Fray J. Hipólito Díaz Henríquez, administrador (1877)
Máximo Gil (1877-1878)
Roberto Sotomayor Montaner (1878)
Nicanor Letelier Guzmán (1878-1880)
Eliseo López Bravo (1880-1882)
Ramón Cañón Vásquez (1882-1884)
Emeterio Arratia Cáceres (1884-1888)
Juan Agustín Figueroa y Rozas (1888-1891)
Francisco Vilches Escorza (1891-1896)
José Luis Allende (1896-1898)
José del Carmen Lagos Tobar (1898-1900)
Justiniano Rojas Olea (1900)
Manuel Gundián Sierralta (1900-1901)
Juan Antonio Grez Marull (1901-1903)
Luis Alberto Rivera (1903-1910)
Tomás Contreras González (1910-1911)
Pacífico Retamal Rojas (1911-1921)
José María Aldana Carrasco (1921-1925)
Jaime Planells Planells (1925-1956)
Source: DOS PARROQUIAS DE LA DIÓCESIS DE LA SANTA CRUZ: SAN ANDRÉS DE CIRUELOS Y SAN JUAN EVANGELISTA DE TAGUA - TAGUA

References

External links
 

Populated places in Pichilemu